Arsim Gashi (born 6 December 1983) is a Swedish footballer currently playing for Assyriska IF.

References

 
 Profile at Fotbolltransfers

1983 births
Living people
Swedish footballers
Association football forwards
Superettan players
Ettan Fotboll players
Veikkausliiga players
Åtvidabergs FF players
FC Anker Wismar players
IFK Mariehamn players
IF Sylvia players
Swedish expatriate footballers
Expatriate footballers in Finland
Swedish people of Kosovan descent